Kan is a village in the Batken Region of Kyrgyzstan. It is part of the Batken District. It is a mountain village on the upper course of the river Sokh. Nearby towns and villages include Gaz, Zardaly and Hushyor. Its population was 661 in 2021.

References

External links 
Satellite map at Maplandia.com

Populated places in Batken Region